Jorma Kalevi "Pilkku" Pilkevaara (24 October 1945, Helsinki – 12 July 2006, Hamina) was a Finnish professional basketball player. During his playing career, he was listed at 1.88 m (6'2") tall, and 86 kg (190 lbs.). He was elected to the Finnish Basketball Hall of Fame, in 2013.

Professional career
Pilkevaara was a member of the FIBA European Selection, in 1967. He won four Finnish League championships, with Torpan Pojat, in 1965–66, Espoon Honka, in 1967–68 and 1968–69, and with Turun NMKY, in 1981–82.

Finnish national team
Pilkevaara was a member of the senior Finnish national basketball team. He played at the 1964 Summer Olympics, and the EuroBasket 1967.

References

External links
FIBA Profile 1
FIBA Profile 2
FIBA Europe Profile

1945 births
2006 deaths
Finnish men's basketball players
Basketball players at the 1964 Summer Olympics
Olympic athletes of Finland
Torpan Pojat players
Sportspeople from Helsinki